"Summer Means New Love" is an instrumental composed by the American rock band the Beach Boys from their 1965 album Summer Days (And Summer Nights!!). Composed by Brian Wilson, it was later released as the B-side to his first single, "Caroline, No", which subsequently appeared on Pet Sounds (1966).

The instrumental has been cited as one forerunner to the type of arrangements Brian Wilson would later experiment with on Pet Sounds the following year. It has since been covered by several artists with new, original lyrics – including by Wilson himself.

Cash Box described the single as an "easy-going laconic instrumental."

Recording
"Summer Means New Love" was recorded over two dates. The primary instrumental track was recorded on May 12, at an unknown studio, with the guitar overdubbed at a June 1 session at CBS Columbia Square.

Personnel
Per Alan Boyd and Craig Slowinski.

The Beach Boys
Brian Wilson – piano
Session musicians and production staff

Release history
The track was first released in 1965 in mono on the band's album Summer Days (And Summer Nights!!) . On August 29, 2006, Capitol released the 40th Anniversary version of Pet Sounds with a 5.1 mix of Summer Means New Love being assembled for the first time. In 2012, the first stereo mix of the track was released on a reissue of Summer Days (And Summer Nights!!).

References

1965 songs
The Beach Boys songs
Brian Wilson songs
Songs written by Brian Wilson
Song recordings produced by Brian Wilson
1960s instrumentals